Songbringer is an action role-playing game developed by Wizard Fu Games.

Gameplay
Songbringer is an action role-playing game played from a top-down perspective.

Development and release
Songbringer was developed by Nathanael Weiss under the moniker of his one-man video game studio Wizard Fu Games. Nintendo's The Legend of Zelda series was a large influence for Weiss who aimed to create a procedurally generated Zelda game with Songbringer.

The game was crowdfunded through Kickstarter in 2015. The game was released for Linux, MacOS, Windows, and Xbox One on 1 September 2017, and PlayStation 4 on 5 September.

Reception

Songbringer received "mixed or average" reviews from professional critics according to review aggregator website Metacritic. It was nominated for "Role Playing Game" at The Independent Game Developers' Association Awards.

References

External links

Songbringer by Nathanael Weiss — Kickstarter

2017 video games
Action role-playing video games
Crowdfunded video games
IOS games
Kickstarter-funded video games
Linux games
MacOS games
Nintendo Switch games
PlayStation 4 games
Video games developed in the United States
Windows games
Xbox One games
Xbox Play Anywhere games
Double Eleven (company) games